Citrus County Chronicle is a newspaper serving Citrus County, Florida and the surrounding areas. It was based in the county seat of Inverness, Florida. The paper was begun in 1889 by Albert M. Williamson as a business encyclical. Walter Warnock, county clerk, took over the publication in the 1890s and added news reporting. The paper has changed hands numerous times throughout the enduing years:
 1914- George Butler becomes editor and owner, transferred later that year to Albert Butler
 1929- Joseph Wilson of Clearwater, Florida buys the paper, and becomes an agrarian populist editor
 1935- acquired by the Scofield Publishing Company
 1946- purchased by a succession of Bradenton owners: N.A. Perry and J.R. Hough
 1947- bought by Col. George Johnson
 1948- sold to the Chicago Sun-Times editor Paul Ramsey
 1959- sold to the Bennett Hahn Company, and quickly thereafter to Frances and Carl Turner of Wisconsin
 1962- sold to a St. Petersburg group led by Herman Goldner
 1980- merged with Landmark Community Newspapers, its current owner

It has since moved its headquarters to Crystal River.

References

Newspapers published in Florida